Luis Miguel González Bosé (born 3 April 1956), usually known as Miguel Bosé, is a  Spanish pop singer and actor.

Early life
Bosé was born in San Fernando Hospital in Panama City, Panama, the son of Italian actress Lucia Bosè (1931–2020) and Spanish bullfighter Luis Miguel Dominguín. Bosé grew up surrounded by art and culture: Pablo Picasso and Ernest Hemingway were close friends of the family. The film director Luchino Visconti was his godfather while Pablo Picasso was the godfather to his sister Paola Dominguín.

Career
Propelled by his famous family and their friends, Bosé started a career as an actor in 1971, taking part in various movies. He quickly found work on the basis of his talent and good looks rather than his family name.  He studied acting as well as dancing and singing. Due to the lack of acting opportunities, he started exploring his talents as a singer in 1975. With the assistance of Camilo Sesto he recorded his first singles. Two years later, in 1977, Bosé signed a contract with CBS Records and he remained with them until 1984. Between 1977 and 1982, Bosè was a major teen idol in Italy, Spain, Southern Europe and in all Latin America. He had 7 top ten hits that earned him a secure spot in every televised song festival held in the aforementioned countries. By 1983 his star had severely waned in Italy, and he rarely performed there again until the 2000s, retreating to Latin American markets instead.

From 1983 to 1985, he participated in the "Llena Tu Cabeza De Rock" television specials on Puerto Rican WAPA-TV. In 1985 he enjoyed his greatest success with "Amante bandido" which topped the charts all over Latin America and in Spain. The video to that song also became one of the most widely seen Spanish music videos, with Bose playing both a Superman style superhero and an Indiana Jones type of adventurer.
In Italy, where he had a parallel career singing in both Italian and English his greatest success would be in 1994 by winning Festivalbar, the second largest musical event after the Sanremo Music Festival), for the third time.

2007: Papito

On 20 March 2007, to celebrate his 30 years as a singer, he released Papito, an album that contains remakes of his previous songs as duets with Juanes, Alejandro Sanz, Fangoria, Ivete Sangalo, Laura Pausini, Shakira, Julieta Venegas, Ricky Martin, Amaia Montero (past member of the Spanish band La Oreja de Van Gogh), Michael Stipe, along with many other singers. Three singles were released off Papito: the first is a re-make of his hit "Nena", featuring Mexican superstar Paulina Rubio; the second was "Morena Mía", with Mexican-American pop diva Julieta Venegas. The third single "Como un lobo" featured his niece Bimba Bosé. "Nena" was by far the most successful single off the album. It was nominated for a Latin Grammy for best song and became the best selling download of Spain in 2007. In the same year, Bosé was awarded the Billboard Latin Music Lifetime Achievement Award.

In 2008, Colombian President Álvaro Uribe offered him Colombian citizenship because of his efforts towards peace in Colombia, including his participation in two concerts in 2008. On 16 March 2010 he received Colombian citizenship during a ceremony in the presidential palace, Casa de Nariño.

2012-2015: Papitwo 

After several "hints" on Twitter, on 4 September 2012 he released the album Papitwo, a follow-up to his successful Papito. The album contained additional remakes of well-known songs from his career, again featuring artists such as Juanes on "Partisano", Bimba Bosé on "Shoot Me in the Back" and Alejandro Sanz on "Te Comería El Corazón". It also included new collaborations with singers such as Pablo Alborán on "Puede Que", Juan Luis Guerra on "Creo En Ti", Tiziano Ferro on "Amiga", Jovanotti on "Mirarte", Malú on his first hit "Linda" (first single in Spain), Joaquín Sabina on "Sol Forastero", Ximena Sariñana on "Aire Soy" (first single in the Americas) and Dani Martín on "Te Digo Amor", among others. The Hollywood actress Penélope Cruz collaborated on the unreleased song "Decirnos Adiós", composed by her brother for Bosé.

The album has two versions, a single disc with 14 previous hits remade with different artists and a deluxe one, with another CD containing 14 collaborations that Bosé made with singers during his career, including Hombres G on "Lo Noto", Raphael on "Morir de Amor", Natalia Lafourcade on "Si No Pueden Quererte", Spanknox on "Wrong in the Right Way", among others.

The album was released to coincide with Bosé's "Papitwo" Tour, which started in Madrid.

Miguel Bosé was honoured as the Latin Recording Academy Person of the Year on 20 November 2013.

2016-present: Bosé MTV Unplugged 
On 7 October 2016 he released Bosé MTV Unplugged, a live album that contains remakes of his previous songs as duets with Sasha Sokol, Pablo Alborán,  Marco Antonio Solís, Fonseca, along with many other singers. Four singles were released off Bosé MTV Unplugged: the first "Bambú", featuring Fonseca; the second was "Gulliver", with Mexican singer Natalia Lafourcade. The third single "Olvídame tú" with Marco Antonio Solís. "Estaré", was released as the fourth single from the album on 7 February 2017.

On 20 February 2018 Miguel Bosé performed in the 2018 Viña del Mar International Song Festival, to a sold-out audience. Bosé performed "Si Tú No Vuelves" with American duo Ha*Ash. On 6 December 2019 Bosé featured on Ha*Ash's single "Si Tú No Vuelves" from the duo's Ha*Ash: En Vivo album.

Personal life
Bosé was in a long-term relationship with sculptor Ignacio Palau from 1992 to 2018. In 2011, Bosé's twins Diego and Tadeo were born via surrogacy. Seven months later, Ivo and Telmo were born through the same method with Palau's biological gene.

On 23 January 2017, Bosé lost his niece Bimba Bosé to cancer. 

During the COVID-19 pandemic Bosé became one of the most active denialists, questioning the effectiveness of masks and other aspects of the virus. Some of his videos have been removed from YouTube and Facebook.

Discography

Studio albums
 Linda (1977)
 Miguel Bosé (1978) 
 Chicas! (1979)
 Miguel (1980)
 Más allá (1981)
 Made in Spain (1983)
 Bandido (1984)
 Salamandra (1986)
 XXX (1987)
 Los chicos no lloran (1990)
 Bajo el signo de Caín (1993)
 Laberinto (1995)
 11 maneras de ponerse un sombrero (1998)
 Sereno (2002)
 Por vos muero (2004)
 Velvetina (2005)
 Cardio (2010)
 Amo (2014)

Live albums
 Directo 90 (1991)
 Girados (2002; with Ana Torroja)
 Papitour (2007)
 Bosé MTV Unplugged (2016)

Collaborations
 Papito (2007)
 Papitwo (2012)

Compilation albums
 ¡Bravo, muchachos! Los grandes éxitos de Miguel Bosé (1982)
 Lo mejor de Bosé (1999)

Singles
 "Soy"/"For Ever For You" (1975)
 "Es tan fácil"/"Who?" (1976)

Filmography

Films

Television

Notes

References

External links
Review of 'Cardio'

1956 births
Living people
English-language singers from Spain
Italian composers
Italian male composers
Italian male singers
Italian people of Spanish descent
Latin Grammy Award winners
Latin music songwriters
Latin Recording Academy Person of the Year honorees
LGBT people in Latin music
Spanish LGBT singers
Naturalized citizens of Colombia
People from Panama City
People named in the Pandora Papers
Spanish composers
Spanish conspiracy theorists
Spanish male composers
Spanish male film actors
Spanish male singers
Spanish male television actors
Spanish people of Italian descent
Warner Music Latina artists
World Music Awards winners
Panamanian people of Spanish descent
Panamanian people of Italian descent